The King-in-Parliament (or, during the reign of a female monarch, Queen-in-Parliament), sometimes referred neutrally as the Crown-in-Parliament, is a technical term of constitutional law in the Commonwealth realms that refers to the Crown in its legislative role, acting with the advice and consent of the parliament (including, if the parliament is bicameral, both the lower house and upper house). Bills passed by the houses are sent to the sovereign, or governor-general, lieutenant-governor, or governor as his representative, for Royal Assent, which, once granted, makes the bill into law; these primary acts of legislation are known as acts of parliament. An act may also provide for secondary legislation, which can be made by the Crown, subject to the simple approval, or the lack of disapproval, of parliament.

Several countries, although having received their independence from the United Kingdom, operate under a system of President-in-Parliament, which formally designates the president as a component of Parliament alongside the House or two Houses.

Fusion of powers
The concept of the Crown as a part of parliament is related to the idea of the fusion of powers, meaning that the executive branch and legislative branch of government are fused together.  This is a key concept of the Westminster system of government, developed in England and used across the Commonwealth and beyond. It is in contradistinction to the idea of the separation of powers. The specific language of "the Crown", "the King", or "the Queen" in parliament used in the Commonwealth realms also alludes to the constitutional theory that ultimate authority or sovereignty rests with the monarch, but is delegated to elected and/or appointed officials. In federal realms of the Commonwealth, the concept of the Crown-in-the-Legislature only applies to those units which are considered separate divisions of the monarchy, sovereign within their own sphere, such as Australian states or the Canadian provinces. By contrast to states or provinces, no equivalent constitutional concept exists in the territories of Australia and Canada, which are not sovereign. The legislature of a territory does not receive its authority directly from the monarch, being instead delegated by the federal parliament. Similarly, with city councils and other local governments in the Commonwealth, the idea of the Crown-in-Council is not used, as the authority of local governments is derived from a charter or act that can be unilaterally amended by a higher level of government.

Practical role in legislating

Because of the sovereign's place in the enactment of laws, the enacting clause of acts of Parliament may mention him or her, as well as the other one or two bodies of parliament. For example, British acts of parliament will start with: "BE IT ENACTED by the King's most Excellent Majesty, by and with the advice and consent of the Lords Spiritual and Temporal, and Commons, in this present Parliament assembled, and by the authority of the same, as follows..." (The phrasing, however, is different when the bill is passed under the provisions of the Parliament Acts 1911 and 1949, without the consent of the House of Lords.) Similarly, Canadian acts of Parliament typically contain the following enacting clause: "NOW, THEREFORE, His Majesty, by and with the advice and consent of the Senate and House of Commons of Canada, enacts as follows..."

Because the King remains a part of parliament, the enacting clause does not need to explicitly mention him, as in realms such as Australia and Tuvalu, where the clause is simply "The Parliament of Australia enacts" and "ENACTED by the Parliament of Tuvalu...", respectively. This may represent a distinction between whether parliament or the King is the primary legislator, however. Similarly, the Canadian province of Quebec does not use a Westminster-style enacting clause. Provincial statutes instead use the clause: "The Parliament of Québec enacts as follows."

The Scottish Parliament follows a different approach. Although its acts require Royal Assent, the Scottish Parliament's authority is delegated from the United Kingdom Parliament, and there is no directly equivalent concept of "King-in-(Scottish) Parliament". Instead of the enacting clause seen in UK acts, acts of the Scottish Parliament bear the following text above the long title: "The Bill for this Act of the Scottish Parliament was passed by the Parliament on (date) and received Royal Assent on (date)".

References

Australian constitutional law
Law of Canada
Constitution of the United Kingdom
Monarchy in Canada
Monarchy in Australia
Monarchy in New Zealand